Tecmo Knight, known in Japan as , is a 1989 beat 'em up arcade game developed and released by Tecmo.

Gameplay

The protagonist Tecmo Knight has the assistance of "Smokeman" and "Tiger". Pressing the "change" button allows Tecmo Knight to switch between the two. Smokeman uses powerful punches and kicks against enemies while Tecmo Knight rides him. While riding the tiger, Tecmo Knight has the use of a spiked ball and chain less powerful than Smokeman's attacks, but with greater range. When slain, a foe's head will break from the rest of the body and often leave behind a bonus item in the form of its skull. When collecting the special dragon skull that randomly appears after defeating an enemy, the Tecmo Knight will summon the most powerful creature to ride on in the game: the Flying Dragon. Tecmo Knight is immune to attack while riding Flying Dragon, whose breath kills any monster in the game instantly, including the stage-end bosses. Using the "Access Attack" maneuver, Tecmo Knight can use Smokeman or the tiger to jump onto enemies and pummel them.

Sometimes, if Tecmo Knight runs low on life, a blow by a weak monster will kill only Smokeman or the tiger, leaving Tecmo Knight to fend for himself with a very weak short-ranged attack. It is extremely hard for him to survive at this point. All bosses in the game appear in "pairs" making it harder for a single player to corner them. The only exception is the last boss Deglomes. Currently, there are two "extra life" bonus skulls known to exist in the game. Players can also utilize "props" like bombs and stone-rollers placed around the map to their advantage.

Much like the 1988 arcade beat 'em up Ninja Gaiden, Tecmo Knight is hard for beginners, because it requires more patience than button-pounding. Like Ninja Gaiden, the game features a rather disturbing continue screen, where Tecmo Knight is about to be swallowed by an unseen monster. If the player does not continue before the 10 second countdown ends, Tecmo Knight is heard screaming as the monster swallows him. Afterwards, the screen will black out, and a monster will tear through the screen shouting "NO FUTURE!", along with "Game Over" appearing under the monster.

Plot
The Japanese version has more detailed in-depth story: a disaster befalls the peaceful Kingdom of Valdik in ancient times. While a pair of best warriors in Valdik's army, Duke and Fleet, were escorting a royal messenger under the order of Valdik King, the Beast Demon Army, a race of gigantic were-beasts thought to have been vanquished before by Valdik, launched a night attack. The army's counterattack was for naught, and all the people of the castle and town were imprisoned. The Beast Demon Army's goal was to resurrect their liege, the Great Beast Demon Deglomes, by constructing a new body for him with copious amounts of human blood through blood sacrifice. On receiving word of the disaster, Duke and Fleet rushed to the occupied kingdom, and were shocked, saddened, and outraged by the sight of the conquest. Calling on the kingdom's three protective deities--the Smokeman, the Tiger, and the Dragon--to empower them, Duke and Fleet become like "wild fangs", ready to put an end to the occupation and prevent the return of Deglomes.

The story on the American arcade flyer is very simplistic: Tecmo Knight, the brave ancient warrior, came to do battle with the diabolical beast known as 'Wild Fang'. But before he can meet this challenge, he must defeat Wild Fang's group of evil monsters.

Reception
In Japan, Game Machine listed Tecmo Knight on their August 1, 1989 issue as being the sixth most-successful table arcade unit of the month.

References

External links

Tecmo Knight at arcade-history
Wild Fang at arcade-history

1989 video games
Arcade video games
Arcade-only video games
Beat 'em ups
Fantasy video games
Tecmo games
Video games developed in Japan